Melissa Williams (born 12 June 1985) is a South African skateboarder.

She competed in the women's park event at the 2021 Tokyo Olympics and was the oldest woman participating in skateboarding at the Games.

Biography 
Williams was born and greww up in Panorama, a suburb of Cape Town, and it was there where she started skateboarding at age 12. In her mid-twenties, she lived in London for three years and, as she described, "spent a lot of time skating all the incredible bowls, snake runs, and [skate]parks that England has to offer."

A person of many interests and pursuits, Williams has worked as an interviewer and organizer for Blunt Magazine, played drums for the bands Black Lung and Bilderberg Motel, boxed competitively, been the marketing manager for the South African branch of RVCA, managed operations of several restaurants in Cape Town, and founded and operated a social media and marketing company. She is not a professional skateboarder but rather skates for fun, in addition to surfing regularly. When asked if there is anything she still wants to achieve, considering all she has already accomplished, Williams responded, "…there is so much cool stuff to do in this life. I want to do it all."

References

External links 
 
 Melissa Williams at The Boardr
 Melissa Williams at Vans Park Series

Living people
1985 births
South African skateboarders
Female skateboarders
Olympic skateboarders of South Africa
Skateboarders at the 2020 Summer Olympics
Sportspeople from Cape Town
South African sportswomen